Thingangyun Township is located in the eastern part of Yangon, Myanmar. The township comprises 38 wards, and shares borders with South Okkalapa township in the north, North Dagon township in the east, Yankin township and Tamwe township in the west, and Thaketa township in the south. The township has 40 primary schools, four middle schools and five high schools.

The township is home to Thingangyun Education College and University of Dental Medicine, Yangon.

The city's main sporting venues, the Thuwunna Stadium and the Thuwunna Indoor Stadium are located on the western side of the township.

Landmarks
The following is a list of landmarks protected by the city in Thingangyun township.

References

Townships of Yangon